Matthias "Hias" Leitner (born September 22, 1935) is an Austrian former alpine skier.

He was born in Kitzbühel.

At the 1960 Winter Olympics in Squaw Valley, United States he won silver in the slalom competition. At the 1964 Winter Olympics in Innsbruck, Austria he ranked 21st in the slalom competition. In 1966, 1967, and 1968 he won the Alpine skiing professional ski racing circuit.

References

External links 
  Hias Leitner at the Kitzbühel Ski Club
 

1935 births
Living people
Austrian male alpine skiers
Olympic alpine skiers of Austria
Olympic silver medalists for Austria
Alpine skiers at the 1960 Winter Olympics
Alpine skiers at the 1964 Winter Olympics
Sportspeople from Tyrol (state)
Olympic medalists in alpine skiing
Medalists at the 1960 Winter Olympics
20th-century Austrian people
21st-century Austrian people